Barefoot Jerry is an American country rock band from Nashville, Tennessee. Fusing country music and progressive rock, they have been described as a seminal southern rock band. The band was most active from 1971 to 1977. It was composed of area studio musicians under the tutelage of Wayne Moss and Mac Gayden. Barefoot Jerry was named after a country fiddle player who performed inside a store next to Gayden's home in the Smoky Mountains.

Both Moss and Gayden had been lead guitarists for Area Code 615 and also for other 615 alumni.

This name is also used to refer to Moss and his sidemen in current reunions and other projects. Moss founded Cinderella Recording Studios and has operated it since 1960.

Moss had previously played in many sessions, including Bob Dylan's Blonde on Blonde, and played the guitar riff on Roy Orbison's "Pretty Woman". In addition to Moss and Gayden, band members included Terry Dearmore, Kenny Buttrey, Jim Colvard, Dave Doran, Si Edwards, John Harris, Warren Hartman, Russ Hicks, Kenny Malone, Charlie McCoy, and Fred Newell.

Career
Barefoot Jerry's first lineup consisted of: 
Wayne Moss, guitar, keyboards, vocals, bass
Mac Gayden, lead guitar, vocals, slide guitar
Kenneth A. Buttrey, drums
John Harris, keyboards

Moss, Buttrey and Gayden originally played together on many of Mike Nesmith's Nashville sessions and had been in Area Code 615. Gayden wrote the number one UK hit single by the Love Affair, "Everlasting Love". He also played the first slide wah wah guitar, on JJ Cale's "Crazy Mama." 

This lineup of Barefoot Jerry recorded Southern Delight before Gayden left in 1972 to form his own band, Skyboat;  Buttrey joined Neil Young's band. Moss and Harris were soon joined by Russ Hicks (guitar, steel guitar, horn, vocals) and Kenny Malone (drums) on the album Barefoot Jerry, released by Warner Bros. Records in 1972. This lineup later expanded to include Buddy Skipper (keyboards), Fred Newell (banjo, harmonica, vocals), Dave Doran (guitar, bass, vocals), Si Edwards (percussion), and (Area Code's) Bobby Thompson (bass, guitar, vocals) for Barefoot Jerry and the 1974 follow-up Watchin' TV.

The lineup of Moss, Hicks, Doran, Edwards, Skipper and Newell were recorded in a live performance in 1973, released in 2007 as Barefoot Jerry Live. Moss was the last original member of the band. Retaining Hicks and Edwards, they added Terry Dearmore (vocals, guitar, bass), Jim Colvard (guitar, bass) and Warren Hartman (keyboards). In 1975 they recorded You Can't Get Off With Your Shoes On. Colvard took his own life in 1976. 

With the departure of Hartman, Barry Chance (guitar) and Steve Davis (keyboards, guitar, vocals) joined the band for Keys to the Country in 1976. Davis and Dearmore departed, and Charlie McCoy (keyboards, harmonica, flutes, Jew's harp) and Mike McBride (bass, guitar, percussion, mandolin) joined for Barefootin''' in 1977. The band split up in that year.

Wayne Moss appears as "Barefoot Jerry" along with Charlie Daniels, Guy Clark and David Allan Coe in the 1981 music documentary Heartworn Highways.

Barefoot Jerry were mentioned in Charlie Daniels's song "The South is Gonna Do It Again."

Discography

Albums
1971: Southern Delight (Capitol Records)
1972: Barefoot Jerry (Warner Bros. Records)
1974: Watchin' TV (Monument Records)
1975: You Can't Get Off with Your Shoes On (Monument Records)
1976: Grocery (double-LP reissue of the first two albums; Monument Records)
1976: Keys to the Country (Monument Records)
1977: Barefootin (Monument Records)
1997: Southern Delight/Barefoot Jerry (2-on-1 CD reissue on See For Miles)
1997: Watchin' TV/You Can't Get Off with Your Shoes On (2-on-1 CD reissue on See for Miles)
1997: Keys To The Country/Barefootin''' (2-on-1 CD reissue on See For Miles)
2006: Keys To The Country/Barefootin (CD reissue; Hux Records)
2007: Barefoot Jerry Live (recorded at the Exit Inn in 1973 - available only from the official website)

Singles

Guest singles

References

The Rolling Stone Illustrated History of Rock & Roll. Random House, 1980. "Southern Rock" entry by Joe Nick Patoski. .
Kemp, Mark. Dixie Lullaby: A Story of Music, Race, & New Beginnings in a New South. New York, New York: Free Press/Simon & Schuster, 2004, p. 17. 
Charlie Daniels Band, "The South's Gonna Do It Again." In the second verse "And all the good people down in Tennessee are diggin' Barefoot Jerry and CDB."

External links
 Official website
 Cmt.com
 Rollingstone.com
 Tennesseeconcerts.com

Rock music groups from Tennessee
American progressive rock groups
American southern rock musical groups
Musical groups established in 1971
Musical groups from Nashville, Tennessee
Capitol Records artists
Warner Records artists
Monument Records artists
1971 establishments in Tennessee
American country rock groups